Norges Hypotekbank is a defunct Norwegian government bank, created by law on September 18, 1851. Its function was to help commerce, and primarily the agricultural sector, through cheap mortgages. The seat of the bank was in Oslo, and was led by a board of three members, two appointed by the Storting and one by the King. By royal resolution of November 19, 1881, it was decided to create district offices in Bergen, Trondheim and Tromsø. The original owner equity of the bank was NOK 2 million, and by 1905 it was NOK 19.5 million. In 1965, the bank merged to form the Norwegian State Agriculture Bank.

Defunct banks of Norway
Formerly government-owned companies of Norway
Agricultural organisations based in Norway
Banks established in 1851
Banks disestablished in 1965
1965 disestablishments in Norway
1965 mergers and acquisitions
Norwegian companies established in 1851